Ian Douglas Foster is a New Zealand rugby union coach and former player. He is the current head coach of the New Zealand national team, the All Blacks. 

He was previously an assistant coach of the All Blacks from 2012 to 2019, a period in which the team won the 2015 Rugby World Cup.

Playing career
During Foster's playing career he made 148 appearances for Waikato, a union record. He also played 28 games for the Chiefs.
 
Foster also played for the NZRFU President’s XV in 1995.

Coaching career

Waikato
Foster was the Head Coach of Waikato for 2002 and 2003. In 2002, Waikato finished first after the round robin stage with eight wins from nine games, but ultimately lost the final to Auckland 28-40. 

In the 2003 season Waikato were second behind Otago after the round robin standings with six wins from nine games. They then lost their home semi-final 29-30 to Wellington.

Overall, Foster's coaching record with Waikato was 15 wins from 21 games.

Chiefs 
In 2004, Foster took over as head coach of the Waikato-based Super Rugby team the Chiefs, with the following results: 
 In the 2004 Super 12 season, 7 wins from 11 games with 274 points for and 251 against. Placed 4th on the table. The Chiefs lost their semifinal 17-32 to the Brumbies, the eventual champions, at Canberra Stadium. 
 2005, 5 wins and a draw from 11 games with 272 points for and 250 against. Placed 6th.
 2006, 7 wins and a draw from 13 games with 325 points for and 298 against. Placed 7th.
 2007, 7 wins and a draw from 13 games with 373 points for and 321 against. Placed 7th.
 2008, 7 wins from 13 games with 348 points for and 349 against. Placed 7th.
 2009, 9 wins from 13 games with 338 points for and 236 against. Placed 2nd. The Chiefs beat the Hurricanes 14-10 in a home semi-final and then lost 17-61 to the Bulls in the final at Loftus Versfeld Stadium, Pretoria.    
 2010, 4 wins and a draw from 13 games with 340 points for and 418 against. Placed 10th. 
 2011, 6 wins and a draw from 18 games with 332 points for and 348 against. Placed 5th in the New Zealand conference and 10th overall.

Under Foster's coaching, the Chiefs made the Super Rugby finals in 2004 and the final in 2009 and had a 50% win ratio.

All Blacks
In 2011, Foster became an assistant coach and selector for the All Blacks under newly-appointed head coach Steve Hansen, a position which he held until after the 2019 Rugby World Cup. During his time as assistant coach, the All Blacks won 93 of 108 tests (losing in just ten), and won the 2015 Rugby World Cup.

In December 2019, Foster was named the new head coach of the All Blacks, replacing Hansen, alongside assistants John Plumtree, Greg Feek, and Scott McLeod. He also announced Sam Cane as the new All Blacks captain.

In November 2020, Argentina beat the All Blacks for the first time.

In 2022, Foster came under increasing pressure after the All Blacks were defeated in a test series for the first time by Ireland, as well as a loss to South Africa. Prior to leaving for South Africa for the Mbombela test, Foster's assistants Plumtree and Brad Mooar were sacked and replaced by Jason Ryan, with Foster taking on the backs coaching role and former Ireland coach Joe Schmidt joining as an advisor. After a review, and support from many of the All Blacks squad, New Zealand Rugby opted to back Foster until the 2023 World Cup. Two weeks later, the All Blacks lost to Argentina in Christchurch, the first time Argentina had defeated the All Blacks in New Zealand.

Coaching statistics

New Zealand

International matches as head coach 
Note: World Rankings Column shows the World Ranking New Zealand was placed at on the following Monday after each of their matches

Record by country

Honours 
 Bledisloe Cup
 Winners: 2020, 2021, 2022
 Freedom Cup
 Winners: 2021, 2022
The Rugby Championship
 Winners: 2020, 2021, 2022

References

External links
Ian Foster at the International Rugby Academy

1965 births
Living people
Chiefs (rugby union) players
New Zealand national rugby union team coaches
New Zealand rugby union coaches
New Zealand rugby union players
People educated at Taieri College
People from Putāruru
Rugby union players from Waikato
Waikato rugby union players
People educated at Forest View High School, Tokoroa